The Argosy was a newspaper published in Georgetown, Demerara, in British Guiana (later Guyana) from 2 October 1880 to 30 March 1907. It became the Weekly Argosy with effect from the issue of 6 April 1907 and ceased publication with the issue of 24 October 1908. It was founded by James Thompson.

Publishing 
The Argosy was contracted by the government to print ‘The Official Gazette’ as well as agricultural reports and mining data. In 1909, The Argosy published a Handbook of British Guiana. At the time, they listed 3 papers in circulation; The Daily Argosy, The Argosy (weekly), and The Sportsman's Argosy (weekly, Mondays).

The Argosy has been described as representing the planter interest in British Guiana.

Legacy
The paper's reporting of births, marriages, and deaths make it an important primary source for genealogists interested in British Guiana. A compilation of its family notices is held on microfilm at the British Library.

In 1979, its columns were also a primary source for Walter Rodney's Guyanese Sugar Plantations in the Late Nineteenth Century: A Contemporary Description from the "Argosy" (Release Publishers, Georgetown).

References 

Newspapers published in Guyana
English-language newspapers published in South America
Newspapers established in 1880
Publications disestablished in 1908
Georgetown, Guyana
1880 establishments in South America
1908 disestablishments in South America